Pivot point may refer to:
Pivot point, the center point of any rotational system
such as a lever system
the center of percussion of a rigid body
or pivot in ice skating or a pivot turn in dancing
Pivot point (technical analysis), a time when a market price trend changes direction

See also 
 Center pin
 Rotation around a fixed axis